Lukas Gugganig (born 14 February 1995) is an Austrian professional footballer who plays as a centre back for SCR Altach. He has represented Austria international at youth levels Austria U16 through Austria U21.

Personal life
His younger brother David Gugganig is also a footballer.

Career statistics

References

External links

 
 
 laola1.at profile 
 bundesliga.at profile 

Living people
1995 births
People from Spittal an der Drau
Footballers from Carinthia (state)
Austrian footballers
Association football defenders
Austria youth international footballers
Austria under-21 international footballers
Austrian Football Bundesliga players
2. Liga (Austria) players
2. Bundesliga players
3. Liga players
Regionalliga players
FC Liefering players
FC Red Bull Salzburg players
FSV Frankfurt players
SpVgg Greuther Fürth players
VfL Osnabrück players
SC Rheindorf Altach players
Austrian people of Slavic descent
Austrian expatriate footballers
Austrian expatriate sportspeople in Germany
Expatriate footballers in Germany